Darchhawna is an Indian writer of Hindi literature and historian from the Northeast Indian state of Mizoram. Born on the New year Day of 1936, Darchhawna is a former Officer on Special Duty at the Mizoram University, when it was the Mizoram campus of the North Eastern Hill University (NEHU) and the founder President of the Mizo History Association. He held the post of the president of the organization for several terms and is holding post, after getting elected in 2013. The Government of India awarded him the fourth highest civilian honour of the Padma Shri, in 2005, for his contributions to Indian literature.

Awards
2005: Fourth highest civilian honor of the Padma Shri, in 2005, for his contributions to Indian literature.

See also 
 Hindi literature
 List of Hindi-language authors

References 

Recipients of the Padma Shri in literature & education
1936 births
Writers from Mizoram
Mizo people
20th-century Indian historians
Living people
Assamese-language writers